National Conservation Area is a designation for certain protected areas in the United States. They are nature conservation areas managed by the Bureau of Land Management (BLM) under the National Landscape Conservation System.

Restrictions vary between these conservation areas, but generally they are not leased or sold under mining laws and motorized vehicle use is restricted, unlike many other BLM areas.

National Conservation Areas 
There are seventeen National Conservation Areas within the National Landscape Conservation System, they are:

References

External links 

Bureau of Land Management.gov: National Conservation Areas and Similarly Designated Lands

 
•
02
Conservation Area
Protected areas of the United States

Bureau of Land Management